Shah Makan (also Romanized as Shāh Makān; also known as Shāh Makān-e Bālā, Shāmkān-e ‘Olyā, and Shāh Makān-e ‘Olyā) is a village in Zaz-e Sharqi Rural District, Zaz va Mahru District, Aligudarz County, Lorestan Province, Iran. At the 2006 census, its population was 300, in 56 families.

References 

Towns and villages in Aligudarz County